Expect No Mercy is the ninth studio album by the Scottish hard rock band Nazareth, released in 1977. The original version was rejected by the label and these versions were the bonus tracks on the Salvo CD. The originally released version saw the reintroduction of a heaviness after the two previously more laid back albums and the tracks were noticeably shorter with only the final track clocking in at over four minutes.

Track listing

30th Anniversary Edition Bonus Tracks

Salvo Records Remaster Bonus Tracks

Personnel

Band members
Dan McCafferty - vocals
Darrell Sweet - drums
Pete Agnew - bass guitar, guitar
Manny Charlton - guitar, producer

Other credits
Nick Blagona - engineer
Mike Brown - remastering
Mick Carpenter - project coordinator
Robert M. Corich - liner notes, coordination, remastering, research
Joseph Geesin - liner notes
Hugh Gilmour - reissue design
Bill Sosin - photography
Frank Frazetta - cover painting

Chart performance

Certifications

References

External links
Lyrics to songs from Expect No Mercy
 

1977 albums
Nazareth (band) albums
A&M Records albums
Vertigo Records albums
Albums recorded at Le Studio
Albums with cover art by Frank Frazetta